NISA may refer to:

 National Independent Soccer Association, a 3rd tier United States soccer league
 National Intelligence and Security Agency of Somalia
 Nuclear and Industrial Safety Agency, part of the Japanese Ministry of Economy, Trade and Industry
 NIS America, the US subsidiary of Nippon Ichi Software
 National Ice Skating Association, former name of British Ice Skating, the governing body of ice skating sports within the UK
 The New ISA, a revised form of the Individual Savings Account introduced in the UK's 2014 budget
 North Imphal Sporting Association, a football club in India
 National Industrial Security Academy, an academy in India
 NISA Investment Advisors, an American asset management firm

See also
 Nisa (disambiguation)